Malaya frog may refer to:

 Malaya bug-eyed frog (Theloderma leporosum), a frog in the family Rhacophoridae found in Peninsular Malaysia and Sumatra
 Malaya wart frog (Limnonectes macrodon), a frog in the family Dicroglossidae endemic to Sumatra and Java, Indonesia

Animal common name disambiguation pages